John Arthur Leonard Parker (10 July 1915 – 9 August 1993) was a New Zealand amateur boxer who represented his country at the 1938 British Empire Games and won a national amateur title in the bantamweight division.

Biography
Born in Wellington on 10 July 1915, Parker was the son of Joseph Elvery Parker and Annie Parker (née Gosling).

Parker won the New Zealand amateur bantamweight boxing title in 1937. He was duly selected to represent New Zealand in the same division at the 1938 British Empire Games, but was eliminated in his first bout, being narrowly beaten on points by the English fighter, William Butler, who went on to win the gold medal.

During World War II, Parker served as a stoker first class in the Royal New Zealand Navy.

Parker died on 9 August 1993, and was buried at Makara Cemetery.

References

1915 births
1993 deaths
Sportspeople from Wellington City
Boxers at the 1938 British Empire Games
New Zealand male boxers
Royal New Zealand Navy personnel of World War II
Burials at Makara Cemetery
Bantamweight boxers
Commonwealth Games competitors for New Zealand